By-elections to the 44th Canadian Parliament may be held to fill vacancies in the House of Commons of Canada between the 2021 federal election and the 45th federal election. The 44th Canadian Parliament has existed since 2021 with the membership of its House of Commons having been determined by the results of the 44th Canadian federal election held on September 20, 2021. The Liberal Party of Canada has a minority government during this Parliament, supported by the New Democratic Party in a confidence-and-supply agreement.

One by-election has been held during the 44th Parliament, following the resignation of Sven Spengemann (Liberal, Mississauga—Lakeshore), to take on a role at the United Nations. Further by-elections are expected in Winnipeg South Centre, left vacant following the death of Liberal MP Jim Carr on December 12, 2022, in Calgary Heritage, following the resignation of Conservative MP Bob Benzen on December 31, 2022 in order to return to the private sector, in Oxford, following the resignation of Conservative MP Dave MacKenzie on January 28, 2023, in Portage—Lisgar, following the resignation of Conservative MP Candice Bergen on February 28, 2023, and in Notre-Dame-de-Grâce—Westmount, following the resignation of Liberal MP Marc Garneau on March 8, 2023.

The writ for a by-election must be dropped no sooner than 11 days and no later than 180 days after the chief electoral officer is officially notified of a vacancy via a warrant issued by the Speaker. Under the Canada Elections Act, the minimum length of a campaign is 36 days between dropping the writ and election day.

Overview

December 12, 2022 by-election

Mississauga—Lakeshore

The riding of Mississauga—Lakeshore was vacated on May 27, 2022 following the resignation of Liberal MP Sven Spengemann to accept a position with the United Nations. Spengemann had represented the riding since 2015, when he defeated Conservative incumbent Stella Ambler.

Running for the Liberals is former MPP Charles Sousa, who represented the area provincially from 2007 to 2018 and previously served in the provincial cabinets of Dalton McGuinty and Kathleen Wynne, including as Minister of Finance from 2013 to 2018. Alex Crombie, a former Queen's Park staffer and son of Mississauga mayor Bonnie Crombie, was seen as a potential candidate prior to Sousa's nomination.

Running for the Conservatives is Ron Chhinzer, a police officer. Michael Ras, who finished second to Spengemann in 2021, considered running for the nomination before declining.

The NDP has nominated Julia Cole, who ran for the seat's provincial counterpart in the provincial election earlier in the year, while running for the Greens is Mary Kidnew, a past president of the Hillcrest Ratepayers Association.

Rhinoceros Party leader Sébastien CoRhino will contest the by-election. As well, the Rhinoceros Party organized a protest against the Trudeau government's abandonment of electoral reform in 2017 by running thirty-two independent candidates, breaking their own record for most candidates nominated in a single riding in Canada, previously set in the riding of Saint Boniface—Saint Vital in the 2021 Canadian federal election.

Polling

Upcoming by-elections

Winnipeg South Centre
The riding of Winnipeg South Centre was vacated on December 12, 2022 following the death of Liberal MP and former cabinet minister Jim Carr. Carr had represented the riding since 2015, when he defeated Conservative incumbent Joyce Bateman, and had been battling multiple myeloma and kidney failure since 2019. Carr also defeated Bateman in rematches in 2019 and 2021.

Carr's son Ben, an educator and former staffer to Mélanie Joly, is running for the Liberal nomination. Winnipeg city councillor Sherri Rollins briefly ran for the nomination before withdrawing and throwing her support behind Carr.

The NDP nominated Julia Riddell, a clinical psychologist who ran for the seat in 2021.

Calgary Heritage
The riding of Calgary Heritage was vacated on December 31, 2022 following the October 20 announcement from Conservative MP Bob Benzen that he would resign his seat by the end of the year in order to return to the private sector. Benzen had held the seat since a 2017 by-election in which he was elected to replace former Prime Minister and former Conservative leader Stephen Harper.

Shuvaloy Majumdar, global director for Harper's international consulting firm Harper & Associates defeated former parliamentary staffer Quinn Heffron  for the Conservative nomination.

Oxford
The riding of Oxford was vacated on January 28, 2023 following the resignation of Conservative MP Dave MacKenzie, who had held the seat since 2004.

Declared candidates for the Conservative nomination include: Woodstock city-county councillor Deb Tait, MacKenzie's daughter; Arpan Khanna, the party's national outreach chair and 2019 candidate in Brampton North; former ministerial staffer Rick Roth.Gerrit Van Dorland, executive assistant to Cypress Hills—Grasslands MP Jeremy Patzer was running for the nomination until he was disqualified by the Conservatives over a dispute whether he disclosed information to the party. On February 2023, MacKenzie accused the party of supporting Khanna, which he believes is a violation of the party nomination rules,  during the race.

Portage—Lisgar
The riding of Portage—Lisgar was vacated on February 28, 2023 following the resignation of Conservative MP Candice Bergen. Bergen, a cabinet minister in the government of Stephen Harper and the interim leader of the Conservative Party and Leader of the Opposition from February to September 2022, had held the seat since 2008.

Declared candidates for the Conservative nomination include: Rejeanne Caron, the party's 2019 candidate in Saint Boniface—Saint Vital and 2021 candidate in Elmwood—Transcona; Winkler resident Don Cruickshank, Morden-Winkler MLA and former Progressive Conservative Party of Manitoba cabinet minister Cameron Friesen; Bergen's former campaign manager Branden Leslie; Josh Okello, Liz Reimer, a Progressive Conservative Party of Manitoba staffer and former assistant to Friesen; and Lawrence Toet, the MP for Elmwood—Transcona from 2011 to 2015.

Notre-Dame-de-Grâce—Westmount
The riding of Notre-Dame-de-Grâce—Westmount was vacated on March 8, 2023 following the resignation of Liberal MP Marc Garneau. Garneau, previously the Minister of Transport and Minister of Foreign Affairs in the government of Justin Trudeau, had held the seat since 2008.

Notes

References

Federal by-elections in Canada
44th Canadian Parliament